Basij Metro Station is a station in Tehran Metro Line 7. It is the current Southeastern terminus of the line. It opened along with Line 7 on 10 June 2017.

References

Tehran Metro stations
Railway stations opened in 2017